Monterey Peninsula College (MPC) is a public community college in Monterey, California.  Established in 1947, it is a part of the California Community Colleges system. There are two additional MPC campuses located in Marina, CA, and  Seaside, CA. The current interim college President is Dr. Mark Zacovic.

History
Monterey Peninsula College opened in 1947 on the campus of Monterey High School. The college separated from the high school in 1961.

Academics
As of the 2022-23 school year, MPC offers 55 different associate degrees in fields such as health, business, and STEM with an additional 32 degrees designed for transferring to a University for a bachelor's degree in the same field. California State University currently has an arrangement with MPC to guarantee acceptance for 14 of their transfer degrees.   They also offer numerous certificates as well.

Athletics
Monterey Peninsula College competes in the Coast Conference as a Junior College. Its athletic teams are known as the "Lobos", which is derived from lobo.

Notable people
 Herm Edwards  was an American football coach Kansas City Chiefs, and New York Jets and former National Football League (NFL) player Philadelphia Eagles, Los Angeles Rams, and Atlanta Falcons. Herm worked for many years at ESPN after his NFL playing and coaching days, and was the head coach at Arizona State University. 
 David Fales was an American football quarterback for the Miami Dolphins of the National Football League (NFL). He was drafted by the Chicago Bears in the sixth round of the 2014 NFL Draft. He also played college football at San Jose State.   
 Joseph Gutheinz, retired NASA official who investigated stolen and missing moon rocks.
 Ron Johnson, American football player Philadelphia Eagles 1985–1989. Ron still holds the school record in the triple jump at 50'2".
 Christopher Kasparek, physician, writer, and translator.
 Jimmy Panetta, James Varni Panetta is an American politician from the state of California. He is a member of the United States House of Representatives for California's 20th congressional district. He is the son of Leon Panetta, who represented the Monterey area in Congress for 16 years before holding such jobs as White House Chief of Staff, Director of the CIA, and Secretary of Defense.
 Chris Barnes  American football player running back Baltimore Ravens.
 Terry Poole American football player Seattle Seahawks.
 Herb Lusk American football player Philadelphia Eagles. Lusk was the first NFL player to kneel in the endzone after a touchdown and pray on October 9, 1977.
 Nate Wright American football player Atlanta Falcons, St. Louis Cardinals (NFL), & Minnesota Vikings.
 Bashir Levingston American football player New York Giants & CFL Toronto Argonauts.
 Maurice Mann American football player Cincinnati Bengals, Minnesota Vikings & CFL Toronto Argonauts.
 Eric Richardson American football player wide receiver Buffalo Bills. He also played college football at San Jose State.
 Nick Cunningham Three-time United States Olympic bobsledder in 2010, 2014, and 2018. Nick played CB for the MPC football team and ran track.
 Matai Leuta Team USA Rugby 2020 Tokyo Olympics.
 Pete O'Brien Major League Baseball first baseman Texas Rangers 1982–1988,  Cleveland Indians 1989, and Seattle Mariners 1990–1993.
 Marco Ramos Team Mexico basketball player who plays the forward position, he participated at the 2014 FIBA Basketball World Cup.
Bill McClintock member of the University of California, Berkeley 1959 NCAA championship team in basketball coached by hall of famer Pete Newell.
Gaylen Ross director, writer, producer and actress best known for playing Francine Parker in the 1978 horror film Dawn of the Dead.

References

External links
 Official website

Universities and colleges in Monterey County, California
California Community Colleges
Educational institutions established in 1947
Schools accredited by the Western Association of Schools and Colleges
Buildings and structures in Monterey, California
1947 establishments in California